Spotted creeper could refer to one of two species of bird:
 Indian spotted creeper, 	Salpornis spilonotus
 African spotted creeper, 	Salpornis salvadori

Animal common name disambiguation pages